Becky Pearson (born January 22, 1956) is an American professional golfer who played on the LPGA Tour.

Golfing career
Before turning professional, Pearson was a two-time winner of the Minnesota Junior Girls State Championship. Pearson, while living in North Branch, Minnesota made the quarter-finals at the United States Girls' Junior Golf Championship in 1973 after defeating defending champion Nancy Lopez in the second round.  Pearson twice won All-American honors while attending Florida International University and was runner-up to Lori Castillo at the 1979 U.S. Women's Amateur Public Links.

Pearson won once on the LPGA Tour in 1986 at the Chrysler-Plymouth Classic.

The North Chisago Historical Society awarded Pearson in 2008 along with two others their Women in History Award.

Professional wins

LPGA Tour wins (1)

LPGA Tour playoff record (0–1)

References

External links

American female golfers
FIU Panthers women's golfers
LPGA Tour golfers
Golfers from Florida
Golfers from Minnesota
Sportspeople from Boca Raton, Florida
People from North Branch, Minnesota
1956 births
Living people